Rhodocollybia butyracea, common name Buttery Collybia, is a species of fungus in the mushroom family Omphalotaceae. It has a number of subspecies.

Description
The cap of this mushroom is 2 to 10 cm across. It is convex and becomes broadly convex or almost flat. When fresh, this species is smooth and moist. It has a reddish-brown colour fading to cinnamon.

The gills are either free from the stem, or narrowly attached. They range from close to crowded and are whitish. Occasionally, they develop a pinkish tone as they age, and often form fine, jagged edges.

The stem is up to 10 cm long and 1 cm thick. It is normally somewhat club-shaped. It can either be moist or dry.

The flesh of this species is white. There is no distinctive odor or taste.

The spores are pale yellowish, pale pinkish, or white.

Ecology
This species is saprobic. It decomposes litter from conifers, usually that of the genus Pinus, and occasionally hardwoods.

Habitat
Rhodocollybia butyracea is quite widely distributed in North America.

Edibility
This mushroom is edible, but unsubstantial.

Gallery

Similar species
Similar species include Gymnopus dryophilus.

References

External links

 Image
 Image

Marasmiaceae

Rhodocollybia